"Trying Not to Love You" is a song by Canadian rock band Nickelback. It was released in August 2012 as the fifth and final single from their seventh studio album, Here and Now.

Music video
The music video for "Trying Not to Love You" was released on August 17, 2012. The music video features Jason Alexander (Seinfeld) and Brooke Burns (Baywatch). In the background at the beginning of the video, the Nickelback song 
"Photograph" can be heard.

Track listing 
 Radio Edit
 Album Version

Charts

Personnel
Chad Kroeger – lead vocals, guitars
Mike Kroeger – bass
Daniel Adair – drums, backing vocals
Ryan Peake – Guitars, backing vocals

References

2012 singles
Nickelback songs
Roadrunner Records singles
Songs written by Chad Kroeger
Song recordings produced by Joey Moi
Songs written by Ryan Peake
Songs written by the Warren Brothers
2011 songs